Richard Krajicek successfully defended his title by defeating Michael Chang 0–6, 7–6(7–3), 7–6(7–5) in the final.

Seeds

Draw

Finals

Top half

Bottom half

References

External links
 Official results archive (ATP)
 Official results archive (ITF)

Los Angeles Open (tennis)
1993 ATP Tour
Volvo Tennis Los Angeles
Volvo Tennis Los Angeles